Moses Magogo Hassim (born November 8, 1976) is a Ugandan sports administrator and politician. He is the current president of the Federation of Uganda FootbalAssociations (FUFA) and Confederation of African Football (CAF) Executive Ex member. In the 2021 general election he was elected to Parliament, representing Budiope East in Buyende District, for the National Resistance Movement.

Life
Moses Magogo was born in Buyende District, Eastern Uganda and currently lives in Kampala, Uganda.

Moses Magogo took the mantle as  Federation of Uganda Football Associations president on 31 August 2013 after succeeding Dr. Lawrence Mulindwa. He was re-elected in 2017 for another four-year term.

Moses Magogo went to Kagulu Primary School in Kamuli District, Jinja College in  Jinja District and Namilyango College in Mukono District before joining Makerere University for a Bachelor of Science degree in Engineering (Electrical).

References

External links 
FUFA President - FUFA: Federation of Uganda Football Associations

1976 births
Living people
People from Kamuli District
National Resistance Movement politicians
Members of the Parliament of Uganda